Tum Mere Ho (English: You Are Mine) is a 1990 Indian fantasy revenge drama film starring Aamir Khan, Juhi Chawla and Kalpana Iyer in negative role as an ichadaari nagin. It was directed by Aamir Khan's father Tahir Hussain.

Plot summary
Shiva (Aamir Khan) is blessed with magical snake-charming powers. When he meets Paro (Juhi Chawla) from a nearby village, he falls in love with her. She is also attracted to him. But Paro's father, Choudhry Charanjit Singh, is not pleased with this match, and he hires men to subdue and kill Shiva, all in vain. Little to Shiva's knowledge, during his childhood, his father attacked and killed a shape-shifting snake in order to fulfill his greed, earning the wrath of the snake's powerful mother who promises to exact revenge. Shiva was bitten, and thought deceased, his family lovingly sent his body afloat a river to which was discovered by Shiva's adoptive Father and revived.

He was then brought back to life with the help for black magic and adopted by baba, who also teaches him about black magic. Their town has a ritual where on naag panchami, whosoever kidnaps a girl and takes her to his house, they can marry them.

Cast

 Aamir Khan as Shiva
 Juhi Chawla as Paro
 Ishrat Ali
 Ajit Vachani as Choudhry Charanjit Singh (Paro's Father)
 Sudhir Pandey as Thakur Choudhary
 Kalpana Iyer as Mother Snake
 Menka Patel as Poonam
 Nissar Khan
 Anirudh Agarwal

Soundtrack

The music of the film was composed Anand–Milind and the lyrics were penned by Majrooh Sultanpuri. The soundtrack was released in 1990 on Audio Cassette, LP record and Audio Cds in Tips Cassettes & Records known as Tips Industries, which consists of 6 song. The full album is recorded by Anuradha Paudwal, Udit Narayan, Anupama Deshpande and Sadhna Sargam.

References

External links 
 

1990 films
1990s Hindi-language films
Films scored by Anand–Milind
1990 directorial debut films
Films about snakes
Films about shapeshifting